Evochron Legends is an online science fiction game developed and published by Starwraith 3D Games for Microsoft Windows. It was released on February 5, 2009. 

In Evochron Legends, The player takes the role of a mercenary pilot in the fictional Evochron sector of space, and engage in various activities such as mining, trading, bounty hunting, and military flight. The player can also pursue story quests in which they must track down and activate scattered beacons throughout the universe, fulfilling certain requirements in order to progress.

Gameplay and Plot
Gameplay is comparable to Evochron Renegades, in which the player takes the role of a mercenary pilot in the fictional Evochron sector of space. The gameplay is a freeform sandbox approach, and allows the player to switch from any of the available roles without menu interfaces. Traditional roles include, among others, mining, trading, pirating, exploring, bounty hunting, and military flight. Like in Evochron Renegades, all environments are interactive. All nebulae can be flown through, with some of the clouds actively disabling or hindering player and AI ship systems. Planets can be descended upon in real-time and used to trade upon, a feature often praised in the now classic Frontier: Elite II. Atmospheric flight differs significantly from space flight, although the controls remain identical. Asteroid fields allow the player to mine and use them as temporary cover, in combat, from missiles and gunfire. Larger asteroids sometimes include tunnel systems that can be explored and used for combat advantages. Objects like planets, stars, and black holes all exert a gravitational pull on the ship.

Flight in Evochron Legends is a hybrid between heavy- and low-inertia flight. By using a ship system called the inertial dampening system (IDS) the player can choose to let the ship automatically adapt the course to the cockpit orientation or to let the ship keep its current heading and speed to turn the ship freely during flight due to the lack of friction in space.

The story revolves around one person chasing the Phantom class battle carrier from Arvoch Conflict and Evochron Renegades. The story seems to be as optional as possible, although completing the quest will yield beneficial advantages.

The story quest lets the player go on a hunt after beacons that are scattered throughout the universe. The player will need to fulfill certain requirements for the beacon to activate. The story builds slightly further on the earlier Starwraith 3D Games.

Features and Improvements
New features include military combat ships ranging from light scouts to heavy interceptors that can be purchased and flown by players, and new capital ships such as Cruisers, Battleships, Command Ships, and Destroyers that can engage in war zone battles. New roles have been added from the previous games, including passenger transport, energy transport, crafting, and capital ship escorting.

War Zones 
Currently, three systems feature war zones, in which the player engages the Vonari along with the military. Through dock able carriers available in the war zones, players can buy themselves military crafts if wished for. By engaging in military missions, the player gains a military rank that allows buying more powerful military crafts.

Crafting 
A new feature is called crafting, in which players use raw commodities to create second-level commodities or usable items. This is done at special constructor stations, which allows the player to create items and more valuable commodities. An amount of platinum can be converted into a long-range probe, and amounts of metal can be crafted into armor plating. Some items can only be crafted by combining multiple commodities together.

Commodities 
New commodities include oxygen, water, gold, and silver. Some of these (oxygen, water) can be gathered from planetary atmospheres and surface. Gold and silver are rare commodities that are both valuable and crucial to create some of the crafted items.

Environments 
While most of the environments from Evochron Renegades return, including planets, cities, stars, stations, nebulae, asteroid fields, and caves, the nebula class that disturbed weaponry has been replaced by a high-energy nebula that jams the jump-drive of the player. A multiplayer mode is present

Difficulty 
The difficulty of the game has been tweaked, giving the game a slightly more balanced learning curve. The learning curve is still considered steep, especially during the first combat situations. The training mode has received a full makeover, allowing the player to choose for either a full training or only focusing on certain aspects.

Multiplayer
Multiplayer in the Evochron series has used the Seamless Profile System, in this system, a pilot profile will always be available on any game server that it not purely limited to multiplayer profiles. This way, players are free to work on their spacecraft in single player.

Capture the flag-like objects allow players and clans to set up a CTF match. Notable locations for such a match include within a high-energy nebula and the interior of a large asteroid.

Any person can host a (dedicated) game server for a predetermined number of players. Other players are required to use a compatible version of the game client to connect to the server, and to have identical universe files. The host of the game sets any rules, although rules are only controlled through players and not enforced by the game itself. In this way, the freeform spirit of the game is retained.

See also
Evochron Alliance
Evochron Renegades

External links
 Official website

References

2009 video games
Space MOGs
Multiplayer online games
Science fiction video games
Space trading and combat simulators
Star Wraith
Video games developed in the United States
Windows games
Windows-only games